Barbados Olympic Association, founded in 1962, is the National Olympic Committee for Barbados. The body is also responsible for Barbados' representation at the Commonwealth Games.

History
Formed after the dissolution of the West Indies Federation in 1962, the Barbados Olympic Association (BOA) first competed at Olympic level at the 1968 Summer Olympics and has continued to compete at every Olympics since excluding the 1980 Summer Olympics in Moscow.

The President Sandra Osborne currently heads up the organization. With Ralph Johnson serving as Vice-President and  Erskine Simmons serving as current Secretary General.

On May 29, 2009 the BOA and the Canadian Olympic Committee signed a Memorandum of Understanding (MOU) for co-operation between both bodies.

The deal covers a pledge of both national Olympic committees to develop stronger partnerships between sport federations of Canada and Barbados with athlete development an area of focus. This includes the free exchange of coaches, officials, trainers, judges, experts and scientists for participation in seminars, courses and counselling.

See also
Barbados at the Olympics
Barbados at the Commonwealth Games
Barbados Lottery

References

External links
 The Barbados Olympic Association

Barbados
Barbados
Olympics
 
1955 establishments in Barbados
Sports organizations established in 1955